The World Health Organization maintains the Global Index Medicus (GIM). The GIM database draws into one reference source several WHO regional databases that cover bio-medicine and social welfare issues. Among these are: The African Index Medicus – AIM (maintained by AFRO/WHO); the Scientific and Technical Literature of Latin America and the Caribbean – LILACS (maintained by AMRO-PAHO/WHO through its specialized center BIREME); Index Medicus for Eastern Mediterranean Region – IMEMR (EMRO/WHO); Index Medicus for South-East Asia Region – IMSEAR (SEARO/WHO); and the Western Pacific Region Index Medicus – WPRIM (WPRO/WHO).

The Global Index Medicus began consolidating the contents of the above listed databases in 2012.

References

External links

 GIM Multilingual Thesaurus

Bibliographic databases and indexes
Bibliographic database providers
Medical search engines